Wiremu Te Kākākura Parata, also known as Wi Parata ( 1830s – 29 September 1906) was a New Zealand politician of Māori and Pākehā descent. During the 1870s he was a member of the House of Representatives and a Minister of the Crown.

Early years, and farming

Parata was the son of Metapere Waipunahau, a Māori woman of high status, and George Stubbs, a whaler and trader from Australia. His grandfather Te Rangi Hīroa and his great-uncle Te Pēhi Kupe were leading rangatira amongst the Te Āti Awa and Ngāti Toa iwi who had settled along the Kapiti Coast.

After Stubbs drowned in a boating accident off Kapiti Island in 1838, Parata and his brother were taken by their mother to the pā at Kenakena, where he grew up.

In 1852, he married his second wife, Unaiki; nothing is known of his first marriage. Parata and Unaiki are thought to have had eleven children.

In the late 1860s, Parata became a farmer, and owned about 1,600 sheep by the mid-1870s. He was, by then, relatively wealthy, and owned the largest farm in the area of Waikanae, a town which was initially named after him ("Parata Township"). He hosted the Waikanae Hack Racing Club on his land, a practice subsequently maintained by his son and grandson until 1914.

Political career

Parata entered politics in the 1860s. In 1871, he was elected to the House of Representatives as the member for the Western Maori constituency, defeating the incumbent Mete Kīngi Paetahi. He remained the sitting member of parliament for the duration of the 5th New Zealand Parliament.

In December 1872, Parata became just the second Māori to be appointed to the Executive Council (thus becoming a Minister of the Crown) joining Wi Katene who had been appointed just a month earlier.

Parata is described by the Dictionary of New Zealand Biography as having been "an astute politician and skilled orator and debater". In Parliament, he expressed the view that Pākehā were not qualified to make informed decisions regarding Māori, and pressed for Māori and Pākehā MPs to work together on laws for the benefit of both peoples. He also called for the appointment of a commission to look into Māori grievances related to land confiscations.

In the 1876 election, he was one of three candidates in the Western Maori electorate and came last, beaten by Hoani Nahi and Te Keepa Te Rangihiwinui.

Wi Parata v Bishop of Wellington (1877)

Parata is perhaps best remembered for the court case which bears his name. In 1877, he took Octavius Hadfield, the Bishop of Wellington, to the Supreme Court, over a breach of oral contract between the Anglican Church and the Ngati Toa, and a breach of the principles of the Treaty of Waitangi. The Ngati Toa had provided land to the church in 1848 in exchange for a promise that a school for young Ngati Toa people would be built by the church. No school was built, and, in 1850, the church obtained a Crown grant to the land, without the consent of the iwi. The case (Wi Parata v the Bishop of Wellington) was a failure for Parata; Chief Justice James Prendergast ruled that the Treaty of Waitangi was a "simply nullity", having been signed by "primitive barbarians". The ruling had far-reaching consequences, as it was invoked as precedent during subsequent claims brought for breaches of the Treaty, well into the twentieth century.

Later life
 In the late 1870s, Parata openly supported pacifist leader Te Whiti-o-Rongomai, providing him and his Parihaka community with financial support.

On 29 September 1906, Parata died at Waikanae from injuries sustained after falling from a horse.

Notes

References

 Biography on the Victoria University NZETC website

External links

 Images of Wiremu Parata and related texts New Zealand Electronic Text Centre

1830s births
1906 deaths
New Zealand MPs for Māori electorates
Members of the New Zealand House of Representatives
Members of the Cabinet of New Zealand
New Zealand farmers
People from Waikanae
Unsuccessful candidates in the 1875–1876 New Zealand general election
19th-century New Zealand politicians